Randall H. McGuire is an American archaeologist, known for his theoretical contributions to Marxist archaeology. He currently lectures in the Department of Anthropology at Binghamton University.

Bibliography

Books

External links
Binghamton University page
Academia.edu account
Personal Webpage

American archaeologists
Binghamton University faculty
Prehistorians
American Marxist historians
American male non-fiction writers
Living people
1951 births